Maurice Levin may refer to:

Maurice Levin, composer of theme for The Play of the Week
Maurice Levin (fashion), (born 1926) American fashion designer, active in Los Angeles between 1950 and 1970